Dr. Ashley Kafka is a fictional character appearing in American comic books published by Marvel Comics, usually in stories revolving around the superhero Spider-Man. Introduced in The Spectacular Spider-Man #178 (July 1991), she was created by writer J. M. DeMatteis and artist Sal Buscema. The character was inspired by therapeutic hypnotist Frayda Kafka. In the comics, Dr. Kafka is a psychiatrist at the Ravencroft Institute for the Criminally Insane, and an occasional ally of Spider-Man. While having been killed by Massacre, two different clones of Dr. Kafka were created with one of them becoming Queen Goblin.

The character has appeared in several forms of media outside of comics, including animated series and video games. A male version of the character appeared in the 2014 film The Amazing Spider-Man 2 portrayed by Marton Csokas.

Publication history
Ashley Kafka first appeared in The Spectacular Spider-Man #178 (July 1991), and was created by J.M. DeMatteis and Sal Buscema. She was killed in The Superior Spider-Man #4 (April 2013).

Fictional character biography
Ashley Kafka grew up in New York with her mother and her sister, Norma, who had been born with severe facial birth defects and was mentally challenged. Kafka looked after Norma while growing up. Their mother died when Kafka was nineteen years old and Norma was left at a psychiatric hospital, where she died a short time later. Kafka then went to college at the Empire State University where she studied psychology and earned a degree.

Kafka goes on to become a professional psychologist specializing in the criminally insane and founds a maximum security sanitarium called the Ravencroft Institute for the Criminally Insane, where she treats super-criminals. 

Kafka is later killed by Massacre during a breakout attempt.

It is revealed in the mini-series Ben Reilly: Spider-Man that Kafka has knowledge of Peter Parker's true identity as Peter reached out to Kakfa for help in dealing with the belief that he was a clone of Spider-Man and not the original.

First clone of Ashley Kafka
During the "Dead No More: The Clone Conspiracy" storyline, the Jackal created a clone of Ashley Kafka. She later suffered from clone degeneration.

Second clone of Ashley Kafka
In the pages of "Ravencroft," Norman Osborn created a clone of Ashley Kafka in a plan to get John Jameson to regain his ability to transform into Man-Wolf.

During the "Sins Rising" arc, the revived Sin-Eater uses Mister Negative's powers to corrupt Ashley Kafka and use her to free Juggernaut from his cell so that he can steal his powers.

When Norman Osborn recovered from the attack from Sin-Eater which purged him of his sins and the police have arrested Sin-Eater's followers at the start of the "Last Remains" arc, he claimed to the clone of Ashley Kafka that Kindred is Harry Osborn. 

Not wanting to give him to the police, Kafka brings Norman to her office where he confessed every bad thing that he has done in his life. When Norman still claims that Harry is Kindred and that he must find a way to stop him before he goes further down the path to vengeance, Kafka suggests to Norman that he should enlist someone who Harry would still listen to.

When Mary Jane catches up to Norman Osborn and attacks him, Norman expressed his remorse for his sins that Sin-Eater purged him of which Ashley Kafka corroborated on. He claims to Mary Jane that Harry Osborn is Kindred to which Mary Jane claimed that she just saw Harry Osborn alive.

During the "Beyond" storyline, Kafka began to work for the Beyond Corporation's Superhero Development division. She was also assigned to be Ben Reilly's therapist.

In her latest therapy with Ben Reilly, Ashley Kafka found out that Ben has lost faith in the Beyond Corporation following a fight with Doctor Octopus. This led to Ashley figuring out that Ben's memories are being tampered by the Beyond Corporation.

After somehow obtaining the Sins of Norman Osborn, the Beyond Corporation captured Kafka to prevent her from interfering with their plans and fused the metaphysical substance of Norman Osborn’s sins to Ashley Kafka which caused her to be mutated into Queen Goblin as dubbed by Maxine Danger. Queen Goblin breaks her restraints and kills the technicians present. She was given some Goblin tech and sent to target Janine Godbe who had escaped from the Beyond Corporation HQ with a drive that Ben had received from Otto Octavius which contains vital information about the Beyond Corporation's true agenda.

Janine met up with Mary Jane Watson at the Daily Bugle as Queen Goblin attacked them. Ben Reilly arrived to fight Queen Goblin as the drive is destroyed during the conflict. As Ben evacuates Janine, Mary Jane is left to face Queen Goblin. She then prepares to subject Mary Jane to the Goblin Gaze only for another man's cries for help to be heard as Queen Goblin uses her Pumpkin Scepter to kill him. After Mary Jane punches Queen Goblin, Black Cat shows up to fight Queen Goblin. Black Cat gets subjected to the Goblin Gaze as Queen Goblin messes with her. 

After Peter Parker catches up to them, Mary Jane and Black Cat give Peter Parker his Spider-Man equipment as Spider-Man faces Queen Goblin despite Mary Jane noticing that his movements are unsteady. The Queen Goblin attempted to cause his death by using her Goblin Gaze on him, but Peter managed to overcome it and defeated her. The Beyond Corporation subsequently took control of her glider to take her unconscious body away from Spider-Man.

Once she regained her consciousness, Queen Goblin took shelter somewhere on an abandoned building. At this point, the sins of Norman Osborn had made it impossible for her to remember who she was before her transformation, prompting her to make plans to go after Norman.

During the "Dark Web" storyline, Norman Osborn finds out what happened to Ashley Kafka when he encounters her on the rooftop of Alchemax and she turns into Queen Goblin. Norman goes on the defense and manages to evade her.

Powers and abilities
Ashley Kafka is an expert at psychology. This trait also followed into her later clones.

When the second Ashley Kafka clone was exposed to the sins of Norman Osborn, she was mutated into the Queen Goblin which gave her a red-skinned goblin-like appearance and granted her super-strength and enhanced durability. She also possesses a Goblin Gaze that causes anyone hit by it to relive their traumas.

Equipment
As Queen Goblin, the second Ashley Kafka clone rides a Goblin Glider and wields a high-tech Pumpkin Scepter that has two features. The first feature can be used in a rigid state. The second feature is a chain retractable state. In addition, the Pumpkin Scepter can fire explosive blasts through the Pumpkin Scepters extremities.

Reception
 In 2022, Screen Rant included Queen Goblin in their "10 Spider-Man Villains That Are Smarter Than They Seem" list.

Other versions

DC crossover
In the Marvel/DC crossover Spider-Man & Batman, Doctor Kafka was present when behavioral psychiatrist Doctor Cassandra Briar attempted to use Carnage as the test subject for a chip that would essentially lobotomise the homicidal instincts of dangerous patients, Kafka objecting to the treatment in the belief that she could still reach Kasady through conventional therapy (Spider-Man doubted this philosophy but agreed with her objections to Briar's work).

MC2
In the MC2 reality, Ashley Kafka ended up falling in love with and marrying John Jameson (son of J. Jonah Jameson) and together they had a son named 'Jack'. Jack became the costumed adventurer known as "The Buzz" without them knowing.

In other media

Television
 Ashley Kafka appears in Spider-Man, voiced by Barbara Goodson. This version is a therapist at Ravencroft and a love interest for Eddie Brock, one of her patients.
 Ashley Kafka appears in The Spectacular Spider-Man, voiced by Elisa Gabrielli. This version is the Ravencroft Institute's founder and a therapist who treats many criminally insane supervillains such as Electro and Doctor Octopus.

Film

 A variation of Ashley Kafka named Rachel Kafka appeared in David S. Goyer's 1997 draft of Venom as Eddie Brock's love interest.
 Ashley Kafka appears in The Amazing Spider-Man 2, portrayed by Marton Csokas. This version is a male German doctor and leading staff member of the Ravencroft Institute for the Criminally Insane, which is controlled by Oscorp. He conducts inhumane experiments on Electro until Harry Osborn sneaks into Ravencroft and releases the latter, who in turn subjects Kafka to the same experiment.

Video games
Dr. Kafka appears in The Amazing Spider-Man 2 film tie-in game. This version is also a male doctor working for Ravencroft who oversees various illegal genetic experiments on patients funded by the Kingpin and Donald Menken.

References

External links
 Ashley Kafka at Marvel Wiki
 Ashley Kafka clone at Marvel Wiki
 Ashley Kafka at Comic Vine
  Ashley Kafka at Spiderfan.org

Comics characters introduced in 1991
Fictional murdered people
Fictional psychiatrists
Fictional characters from New York City
Marvel Comics film characters
Spider-Man characters
Characters created by J. M. DeMatteis
Characters created by Sal Buscema
Marvel Comics female characters